Elections in the municipal council of Madrid, Spain.

May 2003

June 1999

May 1995

May 1991

June 1987

Source: 

Municipal elections in Spain